"The Little Girl Found" is a poem written by the English poet William Blake. It was published as part of his collection Songs of Experience in 1794. In the poem, the parents of a seven-year-old girl, called Lyca, are looking desperately for their young daughter who is lost in the desert. During days and nights they go on looking for the girl up to the moment they find a lion which tells them where the child lies.

The poem
The poem begins with a girl's parents searching for her:

At last, a spirit guides them to her:

Analysis
As a resolution to "The Little Girl Lost", this poem shows the fulfilling of Blake's image of the 'desert wild become a garden mild'; the parents' perceptions of nature have changed, and they no longer fear their natural surroundings. Blake uses this to demonstrate that positive change away from corrupt experience is possible, but only through an acceptance of that which is natural. Crucially, this poem gives hope in the surrounding bleak view of Songs of Experience, and is an effective example of a retreat into nature to learn and develop, an important motif in pastoral literature.

References

1794 poems
Songs of Innocence and of Experience